Terra Firma is the eighth album by Scottish Celtic rock group Wolfstone. It was released in 2007. It saw Ross Hamilton take over lead vocals, only for him to leave the band a few months later.

Note "Back Home" seamlessly segues into "Break Yer Bass Drone Again" (with ..."Drone Again" actually being a reprise of "Back Home"), giving the impression that both tracks are different parts of the same recording.

The album saw a shift in the change of style, with a more alternative rock approach taken to it.

Track listing
 "Back Home" – 3:02
 "Break Yer Bass Drone Again" – 3:16
 "These Are the Days" – 4:52
Dod's Tartan Punk Rock Trews
These Are the Days
 "The Bloody Bouzouki" – 4:39
Ben-Y-Vrackie
The Bloody Bouzouki
 "Paella Grande" – 3:33
The Reel Mackay Wedding
Paella Grande
 "Put Me Together" – 4:08
 "Falun Fine" – 4:24
Asturian Way
Falun Fine
 "Waiting for the Rain" – 3:46
 "Broken Levee" – 2:09
 "By the Wayside" – 5:05
 "3 am in Edradour" – 2:20
 "The List" – 1:39

Personnel
Stevie Saint: pipes, whistles
Ross Hamilton: lead vocals, electric guitar, programming, percussion, bass guitar, acoustic guitar
Stuart Eaglesham: acoustic guitar
Duncan Chisholm: fiddle
Colin Cunningham: bass guitar
Alyn Cosker: drums
Jarlath Henderson: uilleann pipes
Aidan O'Rourke: fiddle
Ross Ainslie: whistle
Brian McNeill: programming

References

2007 albums
Wolfstone albums